Zafer Airport  is an international regional airport that serves the cities of Kütahya, Afyonkarahisar and Uşak. The airport has opened on 25 November 2012.

Location
Despite serving multiple districts, some have criticized the airport's location.

Facilities
The airport's groundbreaking took place on 22 April 2011. As Turkey's first regional airport, it was constructed by IC İçtaş Construction Company in 18 months and financed in the build–operate–transfer form. It cost 155 million (approx. US$91 million) and will be operated until 2044 by the IC Holding.

Terminal
The only one terminal building of  covered area is designed for domestic as well as for international passenger service. The building has 19 check-in counters and four gates. International passengers are handled at eight border checkpoints. There are four baggage carousels at the arrival hall. Zafer airport's annual capacity is planned to be two million passengers. The parking lot is capable of holding 87 cars and eight busses.

Runway
The airport ramp allows parking of five aircraft at the same time.

Airlines and destinations
The following airlines operate regular scheduled and charter flights at Zafer Airport:

Statistics

See also
 Afyon Airport

Further reading

References

External links

Official website
Zafer Havalimanı (Turkish)

Airports in Turkey
Buildings and structures in Kütahya Province
Transport in Kütahya Province
Airports established in 2012
2012 establishments in Turkey